Manuel García Prieto, 1st Marquis of Alhucemas (5 November 1859 – 8 March 1938) was a Spanish politician who served as prime minister several times in his life and as the 30th Solicitor General of Spain. He was a member of the Liberal Party. During his last term, he was deposed by Miguel Primo de Rivera.

Biography 
Born on 5 November 1859 in Astorga, province of León.
Formed in the law firm of Eugenio Montero Ríos, García Prieto entered the former's cacique network and married one of his daughters, María Victoria.

Following the assassination of Prime Minister José Canalejas in 1912, and the ensuing factional division within the Liberal Party, García-Prieto led the so-called demócrata ("democratic") minority, rival of the romanonista majority.

Within the cadres of the Liberal party, the Marquis of Alhucemas espoused just like Miguel Villanueva the policy of neutrality of Spain during World War I, forcing pro-ally Romanones to resign as Prime Minister in 1917.

He died in San Sebastián on 8 March 1938.

References 
Citations

Bibliography
 
 
 
 

|-

|-

1859 births
1938 deaths
People from Astorga, Spain
Liberal Party (Spain, 1880) politicians
Prime Ministers of Spain
Foreign ministers of Spain
Interior ministers of Spain
Leaders ousted by a coup
Presidents of the Senate of Spain